Statistics of Football League First Division in the 1963-64 season.

Overview
Liverpool won the First Division title for the sixth time in the club's history that season. On Boxing Day, 66 goals were scored in the division from 10 games, including Ipswich Town's record 10-1 defeat to Fulham. It was the first double digit scoreline in the division since 1958–59. Other results that day included Liverpool beating Stoke City 6-1, Burnley beating Manchester United by the same scoreline, Blackburn Rovers beating West Ham United 8-2 away and a 4-4 draw between West Bromwich Albion and Tottenham Hotspur.

League standings

Results

Top scorers

References

RSSSF

External links 
wildstat.com

Football League First Division seasons
Eng
1963–64 Football League
1963–64 in English football leagues